Peru will participate in the 2011 Parapan American Games.

Medalists

Athletics

Peru will send seven male athletes to compete.

Cycling

Peru will send one male athlete to compete in the road cycling tournament

Powerlifting

Peru will send three male athletes to compete.

Table tennis

Peru will send two male and two female table tennis players to compete.

Wheelchair basketball

Peru will send a team of ten female athletes to compete in the women's tournament.

Wheelchair tennis

Peru will send two male and one female athlete to compete.

Nations at the 2011 Parapan American Games